Here We Stand may refer to:

 Here We Stand (Cock Sparrer album), 2007
 Here We Stand (The Fratellis album), 2008
 Here We Stand (Game of Thrones, House Mormont)

See also
Here I Stand (disambiguation)